Félix Mantilla may refer to:

 Félix Mantilla (tennis) (born 1974), Spanish tennis player
 Félix Mantilla (baseball) (born 1934), former Major League Baseball player